The Iron Ore Heritage Trail is a  bicycle and hiking trail in Michigan that presents a look at some of the key sites of human and geological heritage on the Marquette Iron Range. Trailheads are located at the Marquette Welcome Center in Marquette, and in Republic west of Marquette. The trail celebrates the geological and human heritage of the Marquette Iron Range, which dominated U.S. iron ore production from approximately 1880 until about 1900. Many of the buildings visible from the trail date back to this period of Victorian architecture. Additional focal points/parking lots for the trail are located at midpoints at the Michigan Iron Industry Museum in Negaunee and the Cliffs Shaft Mine Museum in Ishpeming.

The Iron Ore Heritage Trail is operated by the Iron Ore Heritage Trail Recreation Authority, a free-standing unit of local government that collects a property tax to support the trail.  The trail was largely completed in 2013, but has been upgraded in several cycles since that time.

References

2013 establishments in Michigan
Protected areas of Marquette County, Michigan
History of Michigan
History of mining in the United States
Heritage trails